Allen Holden (18 April 1911 – 12 December 1980) was a New Zealand cricketer. He played two first-class matches for Otago between 1937 and 1940.

See also
 List of Otago representative cricketers

References

External links
 

1911 births
1980 deaths
New Zealand cricketers
Otago cricketers
Cricketers from Christchurch